Carol A. Niemeier (born July 1, 1934) is an American politician who served in the North Dakota House of Representatives from the 20th district from 1996 to 2004.

References

1934 births
Living people
People from Traill County, North Dakota
Democratic Party members of the North Dakota House of Representatives